Mosca is an unincorporated community and a U.S. Post Office in Alamosa County, Colorado, United States. It was named for the nearby Mosca Pass, which was named for the Spanish explorer, Luis de Moscoso Alvarado.   The Mosca Post Office has the ZIP Code 81146.

Geography
Mosca is located at  (37.647675,-105.874043).

Climate
The climate in this area is characterized by warm to hot, dry summers, and cold to freezing winters. According to the Köppen Climate Classification system, Mosca has a semi-arid climate, abbreviated "BSk" on climate maps.

Nearby attractions
 Great Sand Dunes National Park and Preserve (including the Superintendent's Residence and Indian Grove)
 Colorado Gators Reptile Park
 UFO Watchtower
 Trujillo Homesteads

Power Plants
 San Luis Valley Solar Ranch
 Hooper Solar PV Power Plant
 Greater Sandhill Solar Plant
 Alamosa Solar Generating Project
 Alamosa Photovoltaic Power Plant

Economy
FairPoint Communications operated the Columbine Telecom Company in the community.

Education
Mosca is served by the Sangre de Cristo School District Re-22J. It is home to Sangre de Cristo Elementary School and Sangre de Cristo Undivided High School.

References

Unincorporated communities in Alamosa County, Colorado
Unincorporated communities in Colorado